Arto Savonen (born 30 September 1960) is a Finnish weightlifter. He competed in the men's heavyweight II event at the 1992 Summer Olympics.

References

External links
 

1960 births
Living people
Finnish male weightlifters
Olympic weightlifters of Finland
Weightlifters at the 1992 Summer Olympics
People from Loimaa
Sportspeople from Southwest Finland